The Magic Cloak of Oz is a 1914 film directed by J. Farrell MacDonald.  It was written by L. Frank Baum and produced by Baum and composer Louis F. Gottschalk.  The film is an adaptation of Baum's 1905 novel, Queen Zixi of Ix.

Production
The Magic Cloak of Oz had distribution problems, owing to the box office failure of The Patchwork Girl of Oz. Advertisements claimed that the film would be released September 28, 1914, by Paramount Pictures, but this apparently never occurred, though it was apparently released in its entirety in 1917. It was eventually reduced from a five-reel film to two two-reel films known as The Magic Cloak and The Witch Queen. The current prints are assembled from these two films, and so the film is incomplete. All of its titles are missing, and The Magic Cloak title card, which is not in The Oz Film Manufacturing Company style, is used without any additional credits. Its only allusion to Oz is a title card's claim that the fairies of Burzee are "fairies of Oz".

Cast
Intertitles confirm that the cast included Violet MacMillan as Timothy, or Bud, who becomes king of Noland due to a legal loophole; Mildred Harris as his sister, Margaret, or Fluff; Fred Woodward as Nicodemus, the mule, and possibly some other animals as well, and Vivian Reed as Quavo, the minstrel.  Juanita Hansen appeared in the film, early in her career.

16 mm prints of this film are distributed by Em Gee and have been released on home video in various formats with different, and sometimes no, musical accompaniments.  None include that which Gottschalk wrote for the film.  Its highest profile release is on the third disc of the 2005 3-disc edition of The Wizard of Oz. One of the surviving prints of the film (housed at the Library of Congress) consists of 3 reels, which translates to 38 minutes runtime, at 18 frames per second).

In 2009, a longer version of the film was released on DVD and Blu-ray (though not in high definition) as part of the Ultimate Collector's Editions of The Wizard of Oz. The presentation runs about seventeen minutes longer than the 2005 version (if it were played at 18 frames, but is played at 24 frames per second and runs at 42 minutes) and does not contain a musical score. Additional scenes were included, and subplots were expanded upon, including Nickodemus getting help from 4 witches (from His Majesty, the Scarecrow of Oz ), the Roly-Rogues clapping hands on a hill and a sailor making a necktie of a piece of the Magic Cloak he bought. This version was only held in private collections and shown at private conventions prior to the home video release.

Blooper
One intertitle refers to Jikki as "silly old Zixi".  Later Zixi is introduced with the same name.  The name Jikki is used in the book for the first character, but never in the intertitles as a result of this mistake.

Notes and references

External links
 
 

1914 films
American black-and-white films
Silent American fantasy films
American silent short films
Films directed by J. Farrell MacDonald
Films based on American novels
Films based on fantasy novels
Films based on The Wizard of Oz
Works by L. Frank Baum
Paramount Pictures films
Articles containing video clips
1910s fantasy films
Surviving American silent films
1910s American films
Silent American children's films